Michael George Laverick (born 13 March 1954) is an English former footballer who played for Mansfield Town, Southend United, Huddersfield Town, York City and Boston United.

References

1954 births
Living people
Footballers from County Durham
English footballers
Association football midfielders
Mansfield Town F.C. players
Southend United F.C. players
Huddersfield Town A.F.C. players
York City F.C. players
Boston United F.C. players
English Football League players